Chronis Aidonidis is a Greek singer born on December 23, 1928 in Karoti, a village now belonging to Didymoteicho, in Greece. His parents were Christos and Chrysanthi Aidonidis. He learned his first songs in his hometown and was introduced into the word of traditional music by his mother and the musicians who used to play at the local fairs.

Biography 

He was taught Byzantine music first by his father and later by the professor Michalis Kefalokoptis.  In 1950, he came to live in Athens with his parents, where he completed his studies in Byzantine music at the Hellenic Conservatory with the famous teacher Theodoros Hadjitheodorou. In March of the same year, he was hired at the  Sismanogleion Hospital, where he worked as an account. An important incident changed his life, when in 1953 the great folklore scientist  Polydoros Papachristodoulou proposed him to participate in his radio show entitled Echoes from Thrace, presenting for the first time the musical treasure of his fatherland.

Till now, Chronis Aidonidis has released many records with the most beautiful songs of northern, eastern and western Thrace.  He has participated in hundreds of musical events in Greece and abroad (America, Australia, the former Soviet Union, Europe).  An important step of his artistic journey was his especially successful collaboration with the well-known Greek singer George Dalaras for the release of the CD Nightingales from the Orient in March, 1990. The success would continue with one more release of the  University of Crete, in 1993: the double CD Songs and tunes from Thrace.

Another important moment of his career is his collaboration with his student Nektaria Karantzi for the release of the double CD, When the Roads Meet, where he recorded Byzantine Ecclesiastical Hymns for the first time and the CD He was Grieved, where he recorded with his student Karantzi 40 Byzantine hymns of the Holy Week and a folk lament.

In 2001, he collaborated with Nikos Kypourgos for the release of a CD entitled Secrets from the Garden. During the  Olympic Games of Athens in 2004, Chronis Aidonidis addressed a warm welcome to all the guests of Greece, in a unique way, singing affectionately the song Welcome my friends. In 2005, he participated in the Easter  television show of Hellenic Television entitled "He was grieved", where he sang Byzantine hymns of the Holy Week and in 2006 he participated in the 6th Festival of Sacred Music in Patmos, with his student and Byzantine singer Karantzi and the ecclesiastical Byzantine choir, Glorifier (led by Dimitris Verykios).

Nowadays he teaches traditional singing in Chalandri, at the Zisis Foundation and the Central Conservator in Athens. He is artistic director of the  Center for the study of the Musical Tradition of Thrace, Asia Minor and Euxeinos Pontos and also the creator and inspirer of the Workshop for Traditional Music in Alexandroupoli. He is also one of the founders of the  Archive of Greek Music.

External links 

 Official Site
 Tribute to Chronis Aidonidis

1928 births
Living people
People from Didymoteicho
20th-century Greek male singers
Greek folk singers
Performers of Byzantine music
Traditional musicians
Byzantine singers